Einar Førde (20 January 1943 – 26 September 2004) was a Norwegian journalist and politician of the Labour 
Party. He served as Minister of Education and Church Affairs from 1979 to 1981, and director-general of the Norwegian Broadcasting Corporation (NRK) from 1989 to 2001. He was also vice-chairman of the Norwegian Labour Party 1981–1989.

As director of the NRK Førde became a prominent public figure, often known for fearlessly speaking his mind as a knowledgeable political analyst and public debater. After his death Kåre Willoch, former prime minister from the Conservative Party, called him a ground-breaker in society, combining great force of mind with warmth and humour. Førde was also known for appearing in TV-shows on NRK, lampooning his own character.

Førde died of cancer in 2004, at the age of 61. 

In his youth, Førde was a middle-distance runner. Representing IK Tjalve, he ran the 800 metres in 1:52.6 minutes, at Bislett stadion in September 1964. He ran the 1500 metres in 3:50.3 minutes at Leangen stadion in August 1963.

References

1943 births
2004 deaths
People from Høyanger
Government ministers of Norway
Political commentators
NRK people
Norwegian television executives
Deaths from cancer in Norway
Members of the Storting
Labour Party (Norway) politicians
Norwegian male middle-distance runners
20th-century Norwegian politicians
Ministers of Education of Norway